Port-Cartier is a city in the Côte-Nord region of Quebec, Canada.

Port-Cartier had a population of 6,651 at the 2011 Canadian census. Besides Port-Cartier itself, the communities of Rivière-Pentecôte and Pointe-aux-Anglais are also within its municipal boundaries, all located along Quebec Route 138.

History
In 1915, Colonel Robert R. McCormick, owner of the Chicago Tribune, visited the Rochers River area to evaluate its forest potential. Soon after, a settlement was established on the west side of the mouth of this river, originally called Shelter Bay. The post office opened in 1916, followed by a sawmill in 1918 and a debarking factory of the Ontario Paper Company in 1920. Yet the exhaustion of timber led to the closure of the factory in 1955.

In 1958, the Québec Cartier Mining Company constructed an iron ore processing plant and an artificial sea port near Shelter Bay, for shipping the iron ore mined from deposits at Lake Jeannine near Fermont. Port-Cartier, named after the mining company, was incorporated as a town in 1959  and the next year, Shelter Bay was added to it. The original town of Shelter Bay is now the suburb known as Port-Cartier West.

Rivière-Pentecôte

In 1875, a mission called Saint-Patrice-de-la-Rivière-Pentecôte was established some 100 km south-west of Sept-Îles at the mouth of the Pentecôte River. This name is attributed to Jacques Cartier who arrived at the place on the day of Pentecost in 1535. In 1884, the "Penticost River" Post Office opened, frenchized to Rivière-Pentecôte in 1933. At the end of the 19th century, it was among the most important industrial centres along the North Shore. In 1972, the Municipality of Rivière-Pentecôte was formed out of unorganized territory.

On February 19, 2003, the Municipality of Rivière-Pentecôte was amalgamated into the city of Port-Cartier.

Jail 
The Correctional Service of Canada operates the Port Cartier Institution, a maximum security prison, about two kilometres to the north. Convicted murderers including Russell Williams, Paul Bernardo, Michael Rafferty, Luka Magnotta, Mohammed Shafia, Robert Pickton, Guy Turcotte are among the inmates.

Demographics 

Mother tongue:
 English as first language: 1.1%
 French as first language: 97.1%
 English and French as first language: 0%
 Other as first language: 1.8%

See also 
 List of cities in Quebec
 Cartier Railway

References

External links

  Port-Cartier official website
 Québec Cartier Mining Company
 Government of Canada demographic information
 Encyclopædia Britannica entry

Cities and towns in Quebec
Incorporated places in Côte-Nord
Port settlements in Quebec
Quebec populated places on the Saint Lawrence River
Sept-Rivières Regional County Municipality